A kakistocracy is a government run by the worst, least qualified, or most unscrupulous citizens. The word was coined as early as the seventeenth century. Peter Bowler has noted in his book that there is no word for the government run by the best citizens, and that the aristarchy may be the right term, but still, it could conceivably be a kakistocracy disguised as an aristocracy.

Etymology
with a literal meaning of government by the worst people.

History
The earliest use of the word dates to the 17th century, in Paul Gosnold's A sermon Preached at the Publique Fast the ninth day of Aug. 1644 at St. Maries:

Therefore we need not make any scruple of praying against such: against those Sanctimonious Incendiaries, who have fetched fire from heaven to set their Country in combustion, have pretended Religion to raise and maintaine a most wicked rebellion: against those Nero's, who have ripped up the wombe of the mother that bare them, and wounded the breasts that gave them sucke: against those Cannibal's who feed upon the flesh and are drunke with the bloud of their own brethren: against those Catiline's who seeke their private ends in the publicke disturbance, and have set the Kingdome on fire to rost their owne egges: against those tempests of the State, those restlesse spirits who can no longer live, then be stickling and medling; who are stung with a perpetuall itch of changing and innovating, transforming our old Hierarchy into a new Presbytery, and this againe into a newer Independency; and our well-temperd Monarchy into a mad kinde of Kakistocracy. Good Lord!

English author Thomas Love Peacock later used the term in his 1829 novel The Misfortunes of Elphin, in which he explains kakistocracy represents the opposite of aristocracy, as  aristos (ἄριστος) means "excellent" in Greek. In his 1838 Memoir on Slavery (which he supported), U.S. Senator William Harper compared kakistocracy to anarchy, and said it had seldom occurred:

American poet James Russell Lowell used the term in 1876, in a letter to Joel Benton, writing, "What fills me with doubt and dismay is the degradation of the moral tone. Is it or is it not a result of Democracy? Is ours a 'government of the people by the people for the people,' or a Kakistocracy rather, for the benefit of knaves at the cost of fools?"

Usage
In the 20th and 21st centuries, the term has been used to describe:
 The presidency of Donald Trump, during which the term saw increased usage, going viral in 2017 and 2018. It was heavily used by commentators in newspapers, political publications, and books.
 The Brazilian government under Jair Bolsonaro.
 The Mexican government under Andrés Manuel López Obrador. 
 The government of Russia under Boris Yeltsin and Vladimir Putin.
 The government of Egypt under Abdel Fattah Al-Sisi.
 Various governments in sub-Saharan Africa.
 The government of Malaysia under Pakatan Harapan after the 2018 Malaysian general election and under Perikatan Nasional during the 2020–21 Malaysian political crisis.
 The government of the Philippines under Rodrigo Duterte and after the 2022 Philippine presidential election, which was considered to be highly influenced by disinformation campaigns on various social media platforms such as Facebook, YouTube, and TikTok.
 The government of Argentina under Cristina Fernández de Kirchner and generally Kirchnerism in government.
 The Thirty-seventh government of Israel, led by Prime Minister Benjamin Netanyahu who is currently under indictment  has faced criticism due to the presence of several ministers with criminal backgrounds. Multiple commentators have suggested that one of the government's key objectives is to weaken the judicial branch, in an effort to assist Netanyahu in his ongoing legal proceedings and to promote the agenda of his coalition partners on the religious and extreme right.

See also

Notes

References

External links 
 

Pejorative terms for forms of government
Political corruption
Rule by a subset of population